Tory Creek is a stream in Christian and Stone counties of southwest Missouri. It is a tributary of the James River.

The stream headwaters arise just west of U.S. Route 160 1.5 miles north of Spokane. It flows northwest passing the community of Montague and on into Stone County and its confluence with the James River about one mile south of Jamesville and 1.5 miles south of the Finley Creek confluence with the James.

The elevation of the headwaters is about 1340 feet and the confluence is at 1014 feet.

Tory Creek has the name of J. L,. Tory, a pioneer settler.

See also
List of rivers of Missouri

References

Rivers of Christian County, Missouri
Rivers of Stone County, Missouri
Rivers of Missouri